Tsvetomir Chipev (born 16 August 1977 in Sofia) is a retired Bulgarian footballer who played as a midfielder.

Career
Chipev started his career with Levski Sofia and won the Bulgarian Cup in 1998. Having left Levski in December 1998, he had short spell at Pirin Blagoevgrad before joined German side Rot-Weiß Oberhausen.

After two seasons at Niederrheinstadion in the 2. Bundesliga, Chipev signed with Chemnitzer FC in 2001. After leaving Chemnitzer at the end of the 2002–03 season, he joined Erzgebirge Aue.

Honours

Club
Levski Sofia
 Bulgarian Cup: 1997–98

References

External links
 Player Profile at kicker.de
 

1977 births
Living people
Bulgarian footballers
Bulgarian expatriate footballers
First Professional Football League (Bulgaria) players
2. Bundesliga players
Super League Greece players
Cypriot First Division players
PFC Levski Sofia players
OFC Pirin Blagoevgrad players
Rot-Weiß Oberhausen players
Chemnitzer FC players
FC Erzgebirge Aue players
OFI Crete F.C. players
Nea Salamis Famagusta FC players
Kallithea F.C. players
Makedonikos F.C. players
Association football midfielders
Expatriate footballers in Germany
Expatriate footballers in Greece
Expatriate footballers in Cyprus
Expatriate footballers in China
Bulgarian expatriate sportspeople in Germany
Bulgarian expatriate sportspeople in Greece
Bulgarian expatriate sportspeople in Cyprus
Bulgarian expatriate sportspeople in China
Footballers from Sofia